Kevin C. Almeroth is a professor of computer science at University of California, Santa Barbara. He is a graduate of Georgia Tech where he obtained his B.S. in information and computer science in 1992 as well as M.S. and Ph.D. in computer science in 1994 and 1997 respectively. He was named Fellow of the Institute of Electrical and Electronics Engineers (IEEE) in 2014 for contributions to multicast communication, wireless networks, and educational technology. He is a Senior Member of the Association for Computing Machinery.

References

External links

20th-century births
Living people
Georgia Tech alumni
University of California, Santa Barbara faculty
Fellow Members of the IEEE
Senior Members of the ACM
Year of birth missing (living people)
Place of birth missing (living people)
American electrical engineers